Arreton Down is a 29.77 hectare biological Site of Special Scientific Interest on the Isle of Wight, originally notified in 1979 for its geological interest and then renotified in 1987, but for its biological interest only. It is public access land and popular with early morning dog walkers, who park near the chalk pit entrance. The land is marked by extensive ancient field features as yet unexcavated.

The Down
The Arreton Down Site of Special Scientific Interest is a large area of south-sloping chalk grassland in the central part of the Isle of Wight. It is grazed by cattle and horses during the winter, and is dominated by fine grasses such as red fescue and sheep's fescue. The flowering plants are typical of downland habitats and include horseshoe vetch, rock rose, wild thyme, carline thistle, pyramidal orchid, harebell, small scabious and the uncommon bastard toadflax.

There are large numbers of chalkhill blue butterflies on the site as well as small blue, common blue and brown argus butterflies. There are also great green bush crickets and three other species of bush cricket. Scrubland is another habitat on the site and this is where yellowhammers, goldfinches, whitethroat and linnets breed, as well as grey partridges nesting on the ground. ravens, kestrels and buzzards can be seen overhead while barn owls hunt here during the night.

Arreton Down Hoard
An important Bronze Age hoard was found on Arreton Down in the eighteenth century. Comprising seven bronze spear-heads, four axes, one dagger and one halberd, it came into the possession of Sir Hans Sloane who bequeathed it to the British Museum in 1753.

References

 English Nature citation sheet for the site  (accessed 5 August 2006)

Sites of Special Scientific Interest on the Isle of Wight
Sites of Special Scientific Interest notified in 1979
Hills of the Isle of Wight